Nabi Ilyas is a Palestinian village in the Qalqilya Governorate in the western West Bank, located two kilometers east of Qalqilya. According to the Palestinian Central Bureau of Statistics, an Nabi Ilyas had a population of approximately 1,214 inhabitants in mid-year 2006. 25.6% of the population of an Nabi Ilyas were refugees in 1997.

The health care facilities for an Nabi Ilyas are in Qalqilya designated as MoH level 4 there are also two clinics one run by the UNRWA and one run by the Palestinian Ministry of Health.

Location
An Nabi Ilyas is located 5.06 km east of Qalqiliya. It is bordered by ‘Izbat at Tabib and ‘Isla to the east, Ras at Tira and ‘Izbat al Ashqar to the south, ‘Arab Abu Farda to the west, and Jayyus to the north.

History
The village is situated on an ancient site. Cisterns, and graves cut into rock have been found here, together with ceramics from the  Byzantine era.

Ottoman era
Nabi Ilyas  was incorporated into the Ottoman Empire in 1517 with all of  Palestine, and in 1596 it appeared  in the tax registers under the name of Ilyas, as being in the Nahiya of Bani Sa'b of the Liwa of Nablus.  It was noted as hali, empty, but a fixed tax rate of 33,3% was paid on agricultural products; a total of  1,200  akçe.

In 1882  the PEF's Survey of Western Palestine described Neby Elyas (under "Archæology") as: "Walls and wells, with a ruined kubbeh."

British Mandate era
In the   1945 statistics, during the  British Mandate of Palestine, the population was counted under Azzun.

Jordanian era
In the wake of the 1948 Arab–Israeli War, and after the 1949 Armistice Agreements, Nabi Ilyas  came under Jordanian rule.

In 1961, the population of Nabi Ilyas  was  223.

1967-present
Since the Six-Day War in 1967, Nabi Ilyas has been under Israeli occupation.

After  the 1995 accords, 2.7% of Nabi Ilyas land has been defined as Area B land, while the remaining 97.3% is Area C.

Israel confiscated 1,943 dunums of village land (43.8% of the total village lands) for the Israeli settlement  of  Alfei Menashe, in addition to confiscating land from other neighbouring Palestinian villages. The Separation Wall would further separate the village from much of its land.

By 2009 Israeli consumers were using Nabi Ilyas for bargain hunting. Jewish shoppers, who were kept out of the main Palestinian cities by Israeli security regulations, were drawn by the cheap prices for  groceries, furniture and dental treatment that are on offer in Nabi Ilyas.

Footnotes

Bibliography

External links
 An Nabi Elyas, Welcome to Palestine
Survey of Western Palestine, Map 11:    IAA, Wikimedia commons
An Nabi Elyas Village (Fact Sheet), Applied Research Institute–Jerusalem, ARIJ
 An Nabi Elyas Village Profile, ARIJ
An Nabi Elyas, aerial photo, ARIJ
Development Priorities and Needs in An Nabi Elyas, ARIJ

Villages in the West Bank
Municipalities of the State of Palestine